Julio César Chávez Jr. vs. Peter Manfredo Jr. was a Middleweight championship fight for the WBC world title. The fight took place in the Reliant Arena in Houston, Texas on November 19, 2011. Chavez wanted to fight a September tuneup against Ronald Hearns ahead of his November title defense, but he injured his right hand and needed time to heal. Chavez Jr. defended his middleweight belt for the first time against Manfredo Jr.

Background

Chavez
Chavez claimed a 160-pound belt by majority decision against Sebastian Zbik in Los Angeles on June 4. Chavez was due to make his first defense in his hometown of Culiacan, Mexico, on September 17 against Ronald Hearns, the son of all-time great Thomas Hearns. However, Chavez withdrew from the bout about three weeks ahead of time claiming that a laceration on his hand caused by a ceiling fan had not fully healed.

Even before the Hearns fight was scheduled, Arum had an HBO date waiting for Chavez to face Manfredo on November 19.

Manfredo
Manfredo, a star on the first season of "The Contender" reality series, got his second shot at a world title. In 2007, he traveled to Wales to challenge super middleweight champion Joe Calzaghe and was stopped in the third round as he was overpowered by a bigger man in a fight that ended with a somewhat quick stoppage. Later in 2007, Manfredo dropped a decision to former super middleweight titlist Jeff Lacy in a fight that was within Manfredo's grasp in the late rounds. The following year, Manfredo, fighting in front of his hometown crowd at the Dunkin Donuts Center in Providence, Rhode Island, was blown out by rugged Sakio Bika in three rounds in a humbling experience.

After the loss, Manfredo considered himself retired and was resigned to working as a laborer, sweeping floors at the same arena where he had starred.

Undercard
Middleweight Championship  Julio César Chávez Jr. (c) vs.  Peter Manfredo Jr.
Chávez defeats Manfredo via Technical Knockout at 1:52 of the fifth round.

Preliminary card
Middleweight bout  Joshua Clottey vs.  Calvin Green
Clottey defeats Green via Technical Knockout at 1:56 of the second round.
Super Welterweight bout  José Pinzón vs.  Larry Smith

Lightweight bout  Mickey Bey Jr. vs.  Héctor Velázquez
Bey defeats Velázquez via Unanimous Decision. (78-73, 77-74, 77-75)
Welterweight bout  Wale Omotoso vs.  Lanardo Tyner
Bey defeats Velázquez via Unanimous Decision. (79-73, 78-74)
Light Heavyweight bout  Marcus Johnson vs.  Billy Bailey
Johnson defeats Bailey via Unanimous Decision. (60-53, 60-53, 60-52)
Featherweight bout  Luis Zarazua vs.  Ricardo Avila	
Zarazua defeats Avila via Unanimous Decision. (40-36, 40-36, 40-36)
Super Featherweight bout  Gino Escamilla vs.  Ivan Otero	
Otero	defeats Avila via Majority Decision. (36-40, 37-39, 38-38)
Welterweight bout  Cedric Sheppard vs.  Alex Saucedo
Saucedo defeats Sheppard via Technical Knockout at 2:28 of the first round.

Result

International broadcasting

References

Boxing matches
2011 in boxing
Boxing in Houston
2011 in sports in Texas
Boxing on HBO
November 2011 sports events in the United States